This is an alphabetical list of churches in Sweden.


A B C D E F G H
I J K L M N O P
Q R S T U V W X
Y Z Å Ä Ö

A
Abrahamsbergs Church (sv:Abrahamsbergskyrkan), Bromma, Stockholm
Acklinga Church (sv:Acklinga kyrka), Tidaholm Municipality, Västra Götaland County
Adaks Church (sv:Adaks kyrka), Västerbotten County, Norrland
Adelsö Church, Ekerö Municipality, Uppland
Adelövs Church (sv:Adelövs kyrka), Jönköping County, Småland
Adolf Fredriks Church, Stockholm
Adolfsbergs Church (sv:Adolfsbergskyrkan), Helsingborg
Adolfsbergs Church, Örebro (sv:Adolfsbergs kyrka), Örebro
Advents Church
Hallsberg (sv:Adventskyrkan) Hallsberg
Hjortkvarn (sv:Adventskyrkan), Hjortkvarn
Agunnaryds Church (sv:Agunnaryds kyrka), Ljungby Municipality, Kronoberg County
Akalla Church (sv:Akalla kyrka), Stockholm
Akebäck Church, Akebäck, Gotland
Ala Church, Ala, Gotland
Alanäs Church, Strömsund
Alboga Church, Ljung
Alby Church, Uppland
Alböke Church, Öland
Ale-Skövde Church (sv:Ale-Skövde kyrka), Lilla Edet Municipality
Alfshögs Church (sv:Alfshögs kyrka), Alfshög, Falkenberg Municipality
Alfta Church (sv:Alfta kyrka), Alfta, Ovanåker Municipality
Algutsboda Church
Algutsrums Church
Algutstorps Church
Alhems Church
All Saints' Church, Nyköping
All Saints' Church, Söderköping
All Saints' Church, Södertälje
Allé Church, Smedjebacken
Allerums Church
All Saints' Church, Göteborg
All Saints' Church, Ljungsbro
All Saints' Church, Lund
All Saints' Church, Raus
All Saints' Church, Stockholm
All Saints' Church, Visby
Almby Church
Almesåkra Church
Almtuna Church
Almundsryds Church
Almunge Church
Alnö gamla Church
Alnö nya Church
Alseda Church
Alsens Church
Alsike Church
Alskogs Church
Alsters Church
Altuna Church
Alunda Church
Alva Church
Alvastra Monastery
Alvesta Church
Ambjörnstorps Church
Amiralitets Church, Karlskrona
Ammarnäs Church
Amnehärads Church
Andersbergs Church
Anderslövs Church
Anderstorps Church
Andrarums Church, Andrarum
Andreas Chapel
Andreas Church
Andreas Church, Flen
Andreas Church, Göteborg
Andreas Church, Stockholm
Andreas Church, Vaxholm
Aneboda Church
Aneby Church
Anga Church
Angarns Church
Angelstads Church
Angerdshestra Church
Angereds Church, Göteborg
Ankarede Chapel
Ankarsrums Church
Annedals Church, Göteborg
Annelövs Church
Annerstads Church
Ansgarii Church
Ansgars Chapel, Björkö
Ansgars Church
Ansgars Church, Eskilstuna
Ansgars Church, Lidingö
Ansgars Church, Linköping
Ansgars Church, Sävedalen
Ansgars Church, Västerås
Antens Chapel
Anundsjö Church
Apelgårdens Church
Apelvikshöjds Church
Appuna Church
Arbrå Church
Arby Church
Ardre Church
Arholma Church
Arilds Chapel
Arjeplogs Church
Arlövs Church
Arnäs Church
Arrie Church
Arvidsjaurs Church
Asa Church
Asarums Church
Asby Church
Asige Church
Asks Church
Östergötland
Skåne
Askeby Church
Askers Church
Askersuns Church
Askeryds Church
Askims Church, Göteborg
Asklanda Church
Askome Church
Askums Church
Asmundstorps Church
Aspeboda Church
Aspens Church
Asperö Church, Göteborg
Aspnäs Church
Aspås Church
Aspö Church
Aspö Church, Karlskrona
Aspö Church, Strängnäs
Atlingbo Church
Attmars Church
Augerums Church
Ausås Church
Avaskärs Chapel
Avesta Church
Axbergs Church

B
Backa Church, Göteborg
Backaryds Church
Backe Church
Backen Church
Badelunda Church
Bagarmossens Church, Stockholm
Baldringe Church
Balingsta Church
Baltaks Church
Bankekinds Church
Bankeryds Church
Baptist Church
Baptist Church, Havdhem
Bara Church
Barkarö Church
Barkeryds Church
Barkåkra Church
Barlingbo Church
Barnarps Church
Barne-Åsaka Church
Barsebäcks Church
Barva Church
Baskemölla Chapel
Bastuträsk Church
Bellö Church
Benestads Church
Bengtsfors Church
Berga Church
Berga Church, Högsby
Berga Church, Lagan
Berga Church, Linköping
Berga Church, Mariestad
Berga Church
Bergahems Church
Bergkvara Church
Bergs Church
Bergs Church, Härnösands stift
Bergs Church, Skara stift
Bergs Church, Västerås stift
Bergs Church, Växjö stift
Bergsby Church
Bergshammars Church
Bergshamra Church
Bergsjö Church
Bergsjöns Church, Göteborg
Bergums Church
Bergunda Church
Bergviks Church
Betania, Betaniakyrkan
Kungsholms Baptist Church, Stockholm
Betel Church
Betel Church, Hägersten, Stockholm
Betel Church, Runemo
Bethel Church, Råå
Bethel Church, Höör
Bettna Church
Billdals Avlysta Church, Göteborg
Billdals Chapel, Göteborg
Billdals Church, Göteborg
Billeberga Church
Billesholms Church
Billinge Church
Billingsfors Church
Bingsjö Church
Binnebergs Church
Birgitta Church
Olshammar
Sundsvall
Biskopsgårdens Church, Göteborg
Biskopskulla Church
Bitterna Church
Bjurbäcks Church
Bjurholms Church
Bjurslätts Church, Göteborg
Bjursås Church
Bjurtjärns Church
Bjurums Church
Bjuråkers Church
Bjuröklubbs Chapel
Bjuvs Church
Bjälbo Church
Bjällerups Church
Bjäresjö Church
Bjärshögs Church
Bjärtrå Church
Björka Church
Björkbergs Church
Björke Church
Björkeberg Church
Björkekärrs Church, Göteborg
Björketorps Church
Björkhälla Church
Björklinge Church
Björknäs Church, Nacka
Björksele Church
Björkskata Church
Björksta Church
Björksätra Church
Björksäter Church, Bålsta
Björkviks Church
Björkö Church
Björkö Church, Bohuslän
Björkö Church, Växjö
Björkö-Arholma Church
Björlanda Church
Björna Church
Björneborgs Church
Björnekulla Church
Björnlunda Church
Björskogs Church
Björsäters Church
Björsäters Church, Linköping
Björsäters Church, Skara
Blacksta kyrka
Blackstad kyrka
Bladåkers kyrka
Bleketkyrkan
Blentarps kyrka
Blidsbergs kyrka
Blidö kyrka
Blomskogs kyrka
Blåhults kapell
Blåsutkyrkan
Blåviks kyrka
Blädinge kyrka
Bo kyrka
Bockara kyrka
Boda kyrka
Boda kyrka, Karlstads stift
Boda kyrka, Västerås stift
Bodafors kyrka
Bodals kyrka
Bodarps kyrka
Bodsjö kyrka
Bodums kyrka
Boge kyrka
Bogens kyrka
Bogesunds Slottskapell
Boglösa kyrka
Bogsta kyrka
Bokenäs gamla kyrka
Bokenäs nya kyrka
Bolidens kyrka
Bollebygds kyrka
Bollerups kyrka
Bollmoradalens kyrka
Bollnäs kyrka
Bolmsö kyrka
Bolshögs kyrka
Bolstads kyrka
Bomhus kyrka
Bonderups kyrka
Bondstorps kyrka
Boo kapell
Boo kyrka
Borgeby kyrka
Borgenkyrkan, Tierp
Borgholm Church
Borgs Klockargård
Borgs kyrka
Borgsjö kyrka
Borgstena kyrka
Borgunda kyrka
Borgvattnets kyrka
Borgvik kyrka
Borlunda kyrka
Borrie kyrka
Borås Caroli kyrka
Bosarps kyrka
Bosebo kyrka
Bosjöklosters kyrka
Bosvedjans kyrka
Boteå kyrka
Botilsäter kyrka
Botkyrka kyrka
Botsmarks kyrka
Bottna kyrka
Bottnaryds kyrka
Bovallstrands kyrka
Boxholms kyrka
Brahekyrkan
Brandbergens kyrka
Brandstads kyrka
Brandstorp Church
Brastads kyrka
Brattfors kyrka
Breareds kyrka
Bredareds kyrka
Bredaryds kyrka
Bredestads kyrka
Breds kyrka
Bredsäters kyrka
Bredsätra kyrka
Bredåkra kyrka
Bredängs kyrka, Stockholm
Brevens kyrka
Breviks kyrka
Breviks kyrka, Hjo
Breviks kyrka, Lidingö
Bringetofta kyrka
Brismene kyrka
Bro kyrka
Bro kyrka, Gotland
Bro kyrka, Köping
Bro kyrka, Lysekil
Bro kyrka, Säffle
Bro kyrka, Upplands-Bro
Broby kapell
Broddarps kyrka
Broddetorps kyrka
Bromma kyrka
Bromma kyrka, Stockholm
Bromma kyrka, Ystad
Broängskyrkan
Bruksvallarnas kapell
Brunflo kyrka
Brunnby kyrka
Brunneby kyrka
Brunns kyrka
Brunnsbergs kyrka
Brunnsbokyrkan, Göteborg
Brunnskyrkan, Åseda
Brunnsängs kyrka
Brunskogs kyrka
Brågarps kyrka
Brålanda kyrka
Bråttensby kyrka
Bräcke diakonigårds kyrka, Göteborg
Bräcke kyrka
Bräkne-Hoby kyrka
Brämaregårdens kyrka, Göteborg
Brämhults kyrka
Brännemo kyrka
Brännkyrka kyrka, Stockholm
Brännö kyrka, Göteborg
Brösarps kyrka
Brönnestads kyrka
Bua kapell
Bunge kyrka
Bunkeflo kyrka, Malmö
Bunkeflo strandkyrka, Malmö
Bureå kyrka
Burlövs gamla kyrka
Burs kyrka
Burseryds kyrka
Burträsks kyrka
Buråskyrkan, Göteborg
Buttle kyrka
By kyrka
Karlstads stift
Västerås stift
Byarums kyrka
Bygdeå kyrka
Bygdsiljums kyrka
Bymarkskyrkan
Byske kyrka
Byttorpskyrkan
Båraryds kyrka
Bårslövs kyrka
Båtskärsnäs kyrka
Bäckaby gamla kyrka
Bäckaby kyrka
Bäckby kyrka
Bäcke kyrka
Bäckebo kyrka
Bäcks kyrka
Bäckseda kyrka
Bälaryds kyrka
Bälinge kyrka
Skara stift
Strängnäs stift
Uppsala stift
Bällefors kyrka
Bäls kyrka
Bärbo kyrka
Bärebergs kyrka
Bärfendals kyrka
Bäve kyrka
Böja kyrka
Böleängskyrkan
Böne kyrka
Börje kyrka
Börringe kyrka
Börrum kyrka
Börstigs kyrka
Börstils kyrka
Bösarps kyrka

C
Capella Ecumenica på ön Gärdsholm öster om Söderköping, söder om Vikbolandet
Carl Gustafs kyrka
Carl Johans kyrka, Göteborg
Carlskyrkan
Caroli kyrka, Malmö
Centrumkyrkan
Centrumkyrkan, Avesta
Centrumkyrkan, Bjuv
Centrumkyrkan, Heby
Centrumkyrkan, Tumba
Charlottenborgskyrkan
Christinae kyrka
Christinae kyrka, Alingsås
Christina Church, Jönköping
Citykyrkan
Citykyrkan, Linköping
Citykyrkan, Stockholm
Citykyrkan, Västerås
Citykyrkan, Älmhult

D
Dagsbergs kyrka
Dagstorps kyrka
Dagsås kyrka
Dala kyrka
Dalabergskyrkan
Dalarö kyrka
Dalens sjukhuskyrka, Stockholm
Dalby kyrka
Dalby kyrka, Uppsala stift
Dalby kyrka, Karlstads stift
Dalby heligkorskyrka
Dalhems kyrka
Dalhems kyrka, Gotland
Dalhems kyrka, Östergötland
Dalköpinge kyrka
Dals kyrka
Dals Långeds kyrka
Dals-Eds kyrka
Dalskogs kyrka
Dalstorps kyrka
Dalums kyrka
Dalviks kyrka
Dammsvedjans kyrka
Danasjö kapell
Danderyds kyrka
Danmarks kyrka
Dannemora kyrka
Dannike kyrka
Dannäs kyrka
Danvikens kyrka
Danvikshems kyrka, Nacka
Daretorps kyrka
Degeberga kyrka
Degerfors kyrka
Delsbo kyrka
Den gode herdens kyrka
Den himmelska Glädjens kapell vid Gratia Dei i Kristianstad
Dikanäs kyrka
Dillnäs kyrka
Dimbo-Ottravads kyrka
Dingtuna kyrka
Djura kyrka
Djurgårdskapellet, Göteborg
Djurgårdskyrkan, Stockholm
Djurhults kapell
Djurröds kyrka
Djursdala kyrka
Djursholms kapell
Djurö kyrka
Djursdala kyrka
Domsjö kyrka
Donsö kyrka, Göteborg
Dorotea kyrka
Dragsmarks kyrka
Drevs gamla kyrka
Drothem Church, Söderköping
Drottningholm Palace Chapel
Drängsereds kyrka
Dunkers kyrka
Duvbo kyrka
Duveds kyrka
Dädesjö gamla kyrka
Dädesjö nya kyrka
Döderhults kyrka
Dörarps kyrka
Dörby kyrka

E
Eda kyrka
Edebo kyrka
Edefors kyrka
Edestads kyrka
Edhems kyrka
Eds kyrka
Eds kyrka, Grums
Eds kyrka, Sollefteå
Eds kyrka, Upplands-Väsby
Edsbergs kyrka
Edsbergskyrkan
Edsbro kyrka
Edsele kyrka
Edshults kyrka
Edsleskogs kyrka
Edsvära kyrka
Edvardslundskyrkan
Edåsa kyrka
Eftra kyrka
Egby kyrka
Eggby kyrka
Eggvena kyrka
Ekbackskyrkan, Vingåker
Ekby kyrka
Eke kyrka
Ekeby kyrka
Ekeby kyrka, Bjuv
Ekeby kyrka, Boxholm
Ekeby kyrka, Gotland
Ekeby kyrka, Närke
Ekeby kyrka, Östhammar
Ekebyborna kyrka
Ekensbergskyrkan, Solna
Ekenässjöns kyrka
Ekers kyrka
Ekerö kyrka
Ekeskogs kyrka
Eks kyrka
Ekshärads kyrka
Eksjö kyrka
Eksta kyrka
Eldsberga kyrka
 Elimkyrkan
Elimkyrkan, Boden, Boden
, Stockholm
, Sundsvall
Elings kyrka
Eljaröds kyrka
Elleholms kyrka
Emmaboda kyrka
Emmislövs kyrka
Endre kyrka
Enebybergs kyrka
Enebykyrkan, Enebyberg
Eneryda småkyrka
Engelbrektskyrkan, Stockholm
Engelska kyrkan, Göteborg, se Saint Andrew's Church
Enköping-Näs kyrka
Enskede kyrka, Stockholm
Enslövs kyrka
Envikens gamla kyrka
Envikens nya kyrka
Enångers gamla kyrka
Enångers kyrka
Enåsa kyrka
Eriksbergs gamla kyrka
Eriksbergs nya kyrka
Eriksbergskyrkan
Erikstads kyrka
Eringsboda kyrka
Ersbodakyrkan, Umeå
Erska kyrka
Ersta kyrka
Ervalla kyrka
Esarps kyrka
Eskelhems kyrka
Eskiltorps kyrka
Eskilsäters kyrka
Eslövs kyrka
Essinge kyrka, Stockholm
Essunga kyrka
Estuna kyrka
Etelhems kyrka
Everlövs kyrka
Evertsbergs kapell
Everöds kyrka

F
Fagereds kyrka
Fagerhults kapell
Fagerhults kyrka
Fagersta lillkyrka
Falkenbergs kyrka
Falkvikskyrkan, Sölvesborg
Falsterbo kyrka
Famnens kyrka, Stockholm
Fannakyrkan
Fardhems kyrka
Farhults kyrka
Faringe kyrka
Farstorps kyrka
Fasterna kyrka
Fatmomakke kyrka
Felestads kyrka
Fellingsbro kyrka
Femsjö kyrka
Fide kyrka
Figeholms kyrka
Filborna kyrka, Helsingborg
Filipstads kyrka
Films kyrka
Finja kyrka
Finnekumla kyrka
Finnerödja kyrka
Finnträsks kyrka
Finska kyrkan i Stockholm
Finspångs Slottskapell
Fiskebäckskils kyrka
Fittja kyrka
Fivelstads kyrka
Fivlereds kyrka
Fjelie kyrka
Fjälkestads kyrka
Fjällbacka kyrka
Fjällsjö kyrka
Fjärestads kyrka
Fjärås kyrka
Flakebergs kyrka
Flemingsbergs kyrka, Stockholm
Flemmingelands kapell
Fleninge kyrka
Flens kyrka
Fleringe kyrka
Flisby kyrka
Fliseryds kyrka
Flistads kyrka
Flistads kyrka, Östergötland
Flistads kyrka, Västergötland
Flo kyrka
Floby kyrka
Floda kyrka
Floda kyrka, Dalarna
Floda kyrka, Södermanland
Flymens kyrka
Fläckebo kyrka
Flädie kyrka
Fogdö kyrka
Fole kyrka
Folkärna kyrka
Follingbo kyrka
Fornåsa kyrka
Fors kapell
Fors kyrka
Strängnäs stift
Göteborgs stift
Härnösands stift
Forsa kyrka
Forsbacka kyrka
Forsbrokyrkan, Arbrå
Forsby kyrka
Forsdalakyrkan
Forserums kyrka
Forshaga kyrka
Forsheda kyrka
Forshems kyrka
Forshälla kyrka
Forsmarks kyrka
Forssa kyrka
Forsviks kyrka
Fosie kyrka, Malmö
Foss kyrka
Fotskäls kyrka
Fredens kyrka, Sundbyberg
Fredrika kyrka
Fredriksbergs kyrka
Fredriksdals kyrka
Fredrikskyrkan, Karlskrona
Fredsbergs kyrka
Frenninge kyrka
Fresta kyrka
Fridene kyrka
Fridhems gravkapell, Göteborg
Fridhems kyrka
Fridhemskyrkan, Mora
Fridlevstads kyrka
Friels kyrka
Friggeråkers kyrka
Frikyrkan Tystberga, Tystberga
Frillestads kyrka
Frillesås kyrka
Frinnaryds kyrka
Fristads kyrka
Fritsla kyrka
Frostvikens kyrka
Fru Alstads kyrka
Frustuna kyrka
Fruängens kyrka, Stockholm
Fryele kyrka
Frykeruds kyrka
Fryksände kyrka
Främmestads kyrka
Frändefors kyrka
Fröderyds kyrka
Frödinge kyrka
Fröjels kyrka
Fröjereds kyrka
Fröseke kapell
Fröskogs kyrka
Fröslunda kyrka
Frösthults kyrka
Frösunda kyrka
Frösve kyrka
Frösö kyrka
Frötuna kyrka
Fuglie kyrka
Fullestads kyrka
Fulltofta kyrka
Fullösa kyrka
Funbo kyrka
Funäsdalens kyrka
Furingstads kyrka
Furubergskyrkan
Furåsens kyrka, Göteborg
Furuby kyrka
Furuhöjdskyrkan, Alunda
Furuåsens kyrka
Fuxerna kyrka
Fyrunga kyrka
Fågelbergskyrkan
Fågelfors kyrka
Fågeltofta kyrka
Fågelö kapell
Fåglums kyrka
Fårö kyrka
Fägre kyrka
Fällfors kyrka
Fänneslunda-Grovare kyrka
Färeds kapell
Färentuna kyrka
Färgaryds kyrka
Färgelanda kyrka
Färila kyrka
Färingtofta kyrka
Färlövs kyrka
Fässbergs kyrka
Fölene kyrka
Föllinge kyrka
Föra kyrka
Förkärla kyrka
Förlanda kyrka
Förlösa kyrka
Förslövs kyrka

G
Gagnefs kyrka
Galtströms kyrka
Gamla kyrkan i Kävlinge
Gamla Uppsala kyrka
Gamleby kyrka
Gammaliakyrkan, Umeå
Gammalkils kyrka
Gammalstorps kyrka
Gammelgarns kyrka
Gammelsäters kyrka
Ganthems kyrka
Garde kyrka
Gargnäs kyrka
Garniskonskyrkan, Karlsborg
Garpenbergs kyrka
Genarps kyrka
German Church, Göteborg
German Church, Stockholm
Gerums kyrka
Gessie kyrka
Gestads kyrka
Gesäters kyrka
Getinge kyrka
Gideonsbergskyrkan, Västerås
Gideå kyrka
Gillberga kyrka
Sörmland
Värmland
Gillisnuole lappkapell
Gillstad kyrka
Giresta kyrka
Gislaveds kyrka
Gislövs kyrka
Gistads kyrka
Gladhammars kyrka
Gladsax kyrka
Glanshammars kyrka
Glava kyrka
Glemminge kyrka
Glimåkra kyrka
Glommersträsk kapell
Glostorps kyrka, Malmö
Glumslövs kyrka
Glömminge kyrka
Glöstorpskyrkan, Göteborg
Gnarps kyrka
Gnosjö kyrka
Godegårds kyrka
Gothems kyrka
Gottröra kyrka
Gottsunda kyrka
Grangärde kyrka
Granults kyrka
Graninge kyrka
Värmdö
Ångermanland
Granlo kyrka
Granö kyrka
Gratia Dei
Grava kyrka
Grebbestads kyrka
Grebo kyrka
Gredelbykyrkan, Knivsta
Grevbäcks kyrka
Grevegårdens kyrka, Göteborg
Grevie kyrka
Gribbylunds kapell
Grimetons kyrka
Grimmareds kyrka
Grimsås kyrka
Grinneröds kyrka
Grinstad kyrka
Grisslehamns kapell
Grolanda kyrka
Grude kyrka
Grums kyrka
Grundsunda kyrka
Grundsunds kyrka
Grycksbo kyrka
Gryta kyrka
Gryteryds kyrka
Grythyttans kyrka
Grytnäs kyrka
Gryts kyrka
Skåne
Sörmland
Östergötland
Gråträsk kapell
Grängesbergs kyrka
Grängsbo lillkyrka
Gränna kyrka
Gräsgårds kyrka
Gräshagskyrkan
Gräsmarks kyrka
Grästorps kyrka
Gräsvikens kapell
Gräsö kyrka
Gräve kyrka
Grödinge kyrka
Grönahögs kyrka
Grönby kyrka
Gröndals kyrka, Stockholm
Grötlingbo kyrka
Gualövs kyrka
Gudhems kyrka
Gudmundrå kyrka
Gudmundstorps kyrka
Guldhedens småkyrka, Göteborg
Guldrupe kyrka
Guldsmedshyttans kyrka
Gullabo kyrka
Gullereds kyrka
Gullholmens kyrka
Gullängets kyrka
Gumlösa kyrka
Gunnareds kyrka, Göteborg
Gunnarps kyrka
Gunnarsbyns kyrka
Gunnarsjö kyrka
Gunnarskogs kyrka
Gunnarsnäs kyrka
Gunnilbo kyrka
Gustaf Adolfskyrkan, Stockholm
Gustaf Vasa kyrka, Stockholm
Gustafs kyrka
Gustav Adolf Church
Borås
Helsingborg
Habo Municipality
Sundsvall
Viby
Värmland
Gustav III:s kyrka, Ramsberg
Gustavsbergs kyrka
Gylle kyrka
Gyllenfors kapell
Gånghesters kyrka
Gårdeby kyrka
Gårdsby kyrka
Gårdstens kyrka, Göteborg
Gårdstånga kyrka
Gåsborns kyrka
Gåsinge kyrka
Gåxsjö kyrka
Gällareds kyrka
Gällaryds kyrka
Gällersta kyrka
Gällinge kyrka
Gällivare gamla kyrka
Gällivare kyrka
Gällstads kyrka
Gärdhems kyrka
Gärdnäs kapell
Gärdslösa kyrka
Gärdserums kyrka
Gärdslösa kyrka
Gärdslövs kyrka
Gödelövs kyrka
Gödestads kyrka
Gökhems kyrka
Görslövs kyrka
Gösslunda kyrka
Götalundens kyrka
Göteborgs domkyrka, Göteborg
Götene kyrka
Göteryds kyrka
Göteve kyrka
Götlunda kyrka
Arboga
Västergötland

H
Habo kyrka
Hablingbo kyrka
Haga kyrka
Hagabergs kapell
Hagakyrkan
Hagakyrkan, Borlänge
Hagakyrkan, Göteborg
Hagakyrkan, Markaryd
Hagakyrkan, Sundsvall
Hagakyrkan, Örebro
Hagalunds kyrka
Hallaröds kyrka
Hallundakyrkan, Norsborg
Hamburgsunds kapell
Hammarby kyrka, Eskilstuna
Hammarby kyrka, Uppland
Hammarbykyrkan, Stockholm
Hammarkullens kyrka, Göteborg
Hammarlunda kyrka
Hammarlövs kyrka
Hammenhögs kyrka
Hamra kyrka
Hamrånge kyrka
Hannas kyrka
Hanhals kyrka
Harakers kyrka
Hardeberga kyrka
Harlösa kyrka
Hassle-Bösarps kyrka
Havstenssunds kapell
Haverö kyrka
Heda kyrka, Ödeshög
Hedareds stavkyrka
Hedemora kyrka
Hedvig Eleonora kyrka, Stockholm
Hedvigs kyrka, Norrköping
Hejdeby kyrka
Helena Elisabeths kyrka
Helgeandskyrkan, Lund
Helgesta kyrka
Heliga Kors kyrka, Ronneby
Heliga Trefaldighets kyrka, Kristianstad
Heliga Trefaldighetskyrkan, Malmö
Hillareds kyrka
Hjortensbergskyrkan, Nyköping
Hjorthagens kyrka, Stockholm
Hjortsberga kyrka
Hjällbo kyrka, Göteborg
Hjälmseryds gamla kyrka
Hjärtums kyrka
Hofterups kyrka
Holms kyrka
Hosjö kyrka
Huaröds kyrka
Huddinge kyrka
Hults kyrka
Hultsfreds kyrka
Husaby kyrka
Husby kyrka
Husie kyrka, Malmö
Hyby gamla kyrka
Hyby kyrka
Hyllie kyrka, Malmö
Hyllinge småkyrka
Hyltinge kyrka
Hyssna gamla kyrka
Hyssna kyrka
Håby kyrka
Hålanda kyrka
Håle-Tängs kyrka
Hålta kyrka
Håslövs kyrka
Håstads kyrka
Hägerstads gamla kyrka
Hägerstads kyrka
Häggeby kyrka
Häggenkyrkan, Oxelösund
Hällaryds kyrka
Hälleberga kyrka
Hällestads kyrka
Hälsingtuna kyrka
Häradshammars kyrka
Härkeberga kyrka
Härlanda kyrka, Göteborg
Härlanda kyrkoruin, Göteborg
Härnösands domkyrka
Härryda kyrka
Härslövs kyrka
Hässelby Strands kyrka, Stockholm
Hässelby Villastads kyrka, Stockholm
Hässleby kyrka, Mariannelund
Hässlunda kyrka
Hästveda kyrka
Högalidskyrkan, Stockholm
Höganäs kyrka
Högbergskyrkan, Ludvika
Högbo kyrka
Högdalskyrkan, Bandhagen
Högs kyrka
Högs kyrka, Hälsingland
Högs kyrka, Skåne
Högsbo kyrka, Göteborg
Hököpings kyrka
Hölö kyrka
Höreda kyrka
Hörröds kyrka
Hörups kyrka
Höörs kyrka
Hedeskoga kyrka, Ystad
Högestads kyrka, Ystad
Högåskyrkan, Tibro

I
Idre kyrka
Igelösa kyrka
Iggesunds kyrka
Immanuel Church
Immanuel Church, Gävle
Immanuel Church, Jönköping
Immanuel Church, Stockholm
Immanuel Church, Trelleborg
Ingatorps kyrka
Ingelstorps kyrka
Iskyrkan i Jukkasjärvi
Ivetofta kyrka

J
Jakobs kyrka, Stockholm
Jakobsbergskyrkan, Järfälla
Johannebergkyrkan, Göteborg
Johanneskyrkan
Saint John the Baptist's Church, Landskrona (defunctional building, outdoor ceremonies only)
Jonsbergs kyrka, Vikbolandet
Jordbro kyrka
Josephina kyrka, Färingtofta
Jukkasjärvi kyrka
Jumkil kyrka
Järfälla kyrka
Järlåsa kyrka
Järpås kyrka
Järrestads kyrka
Jättendals kyrka

K
Kaga kyrka
Kaitum kapell
Kallinge kyrka
Kalmar domkyrka
Kalmar kyrka
Kalvträsks kyrka
Kanalkyrkan, Sandviken
Karaby kyrka
Kareby kyrka
Karesuando kyrka
Karls kyrkoruin
Karlsdals kapell
Karlskoga kyrka
Karlstads domkyrka
Karlstorps kyrka
Kastalakyrkan, Kungälv
Kastlösa kyrka
Katarina kyrka, Stockholm
Katslösa kyrka
Kattarps kyrka
Kattnäs kyrka
Kaverös kyrka, Göteborg
Kiaby kyrka
Kilanda kyrka
Kimstads kyrka
Kinne-Vedums kyrka
Kinneveds kyrka
Kirsebergs kyrka, Malmö
Kiviks kapell
Kiruna kyrka
Kisa kyrka
Kista kyrka, Stockholm
Kjula kyrka
Klara kyrka, Stockholm - se Sankta Clara kyrka
Klockrike kyrka
Klosters kyrka
Klädesholmens kyrka
Klövedals kyrka
Klöveskogs kapell
Klövsjö kyrka
Knivsta gamla kyrka
Knutby kyrka
Knäbäckskapellet
Knästorps kyrka
Kolmårdskyrkan
Konga kyrka
Konungsunds kyrka
Korsbackakyrkan
Kortedalakyrkan
Kristbergs kyrka
Kristdala kyrka
Kristianopels kyrka
Kristina kyrka
Kristine Church, Falun
Kristine Church, Sala
Kristinedalskyrkan
Kristinehamns kyrka
Kristofferkyrkan, Karlshamn
Krokeks kyrka
Krylbo kyrka
Kråkshults kyrka
Kråksmåla kyrka
Kräklingbo kyrka
Krämarekapellet
Kuddby kyrka
Kulla kyrka, Uppland
Kullerstads kyrka
Kullings-Skövde kyrka
Kullkyrkan
Kumla kyrka, Närke
Kumla kyrka, Västmanland
Kumla kyrka, Östergötland
Kumlaby kyrka, Visingsö
Kummelby kyrka
Kungsholms baptistkyrka, Stockholm
Kungsholms kyrka, Stockholm
Kungsladugårds kyrka, Göteborg
Kungslena kyrka
Kungsmarkskyrkan
Kungälvs kyrka
Kvarsebo kyrka
Kverrestads kyrka
Kvidinge kyrka
Kviinge kyrka
Kville kyrka
Kvillinge kyrka
Kvistbro kyrka
Kvistofta kyrka
Kyrkefalla kyrka, Tibro
Kyrkheddinge kyrka
Kyrkhults kyrka
Kyrkoköpinge kyrka
Kåge kyrka
Kågedalens kyrka
Kågeröds kyrka
Kållereds kyrka
Kårsta kyrka
Källa ödekyrka
Källartorpskyrkan, Dala-Järna
Källby kyrka
Källeryds kyrka
Källs-Nöbbelövs kyrka
Källstads kyrka
Källstorps kyrka
Källunge kyrka
Kärda kyrka
Käringöns kyrka
Kärlekens kyrka, Halmstad
Kärna kyrka
Kärra kapell, Göteborg
Kättilstads kyrka
Köpings kyrka, Öland

L
Lackalänga kyrka
Lammhults kyrka
Landalakapellet, Göteborg
Landeryds kyrka
Landskyrkan, Alingsås
Lagmansereds kyrka
Laholms kyrka, se Sankt Clemens kyrka
 Landa kyrka, Kungsbacka
Lannaskede gamla kyrka
Lannaskede-Myresjö kyrka
Lannavaara kyrka
Latiksbergs kyrka
Lavads kyrka
Leksand Church
Lena kyrka, Uppsala stift
Lerums kyrka
Lextorpskyrkan
Lidakyrkan, Västerhaninge
Lidingö kyrka
Lilla Harrie kyrka
Lillkyrkan, Motala
Lillkyrkan & Columbariet, Stockholm
Lillmokyrkan, Malung
Limhamns kyrka, Malmö
Linderöds kyrka
Lindesbergs kyrka
Linköpings domkyrka, Linköping
Linnékyrkan, Göteborg
Linnékyrkan, Limhamn
Listerby kyrka
Ljungarum Church, Jönköping
Ljungkyrkan, Höllviken
Ljusdals kyrka
Ljusets kyrka
Ljusterö kyrka
Lockarps kyrka, Malmö
Locknevi kyrka
Lomma kyrka
Loshults kyrka
Luleå domkyrka
Lundby kyrka, Västerås
Lundby gamla kyrka, Göteborg
Lundby nya kyrka, Göteborg
Lunds Allhelgonakyrka, se Allhelgonakyrkan, Lund
Lunds domkyrka, Lund
Lungsunds kyrka, Storfors, Värmland
Lurs kyrka
Lutherska Missionskyrkan
Lutherska Missionskyrkan, Borås
Lutherska Missionskyrkan, Göteborg
Lyckebokyrkan, Storvreta
Lyngby kyrka
Lysekils kyrka
Långareds kyrka
Långelanda kyrka
Långlöts kyrka
Långshyttans kyrka
Längbro kyrka
Länsmansgårdens kyrka, Göteborg
Löderups kyrka
Lödöse (gamla) kyrka, se Sankt Peders kyrka
Lögdö kyrka
Lönnbergskyrkan, Bergsjö
Lönneberga kyrka
Lösens kyrka
Lötenkyrkan
Lövgärdets kyrka, Göteborg

M
Maglarps kyrka
Maglarps nya kyrka
Malexander Church
Malå kyrka
Malma kapell
Malma kyrka
Mangskogs kyrka
Maria Magdalena kyrka
Maria Magdalena kyrka, Lund
Maria Magdalena kyrka, Stockholm
Mariakyrkan, se även Sankta Maria kyrka nedan
Mariakyrkan, Boden
Mariakyrkan, Brönnestad
Mariakyrkan, Båstad
Mariakyrkan, Danderyd
Mariakyrkan, Eskilstuna
Mariakyrkan, Frösön
Mariakyrkan, Gråmanstorp
Mariakyrkan, Gävle
Mariakyrkan, Göteborg
Mariakyrkan, Halmstad
Mariakyrkan, Helsingborg
Mariakyrkan, Katrineholm
Mariakyrkan, Lidköping
Mariakyrkan, Ljungby
Mariakyrkan, Sigtuna
Mariakyrkan, Skogås
Mariakyrkan, Umeå
Mariakyrkan, Värnamo
Mariakyrkan, Växjö
Mariebergs gravkapell, Göteborg
Marieholmskyrkan, Mariestad
Mariedalskyrkan, Karlskrona
Mariehälls kyrka, Stockholm
Mariestads domkyrka
Maria Magdalena kyrka, Stockholm
Maria Magdalena kyrka, Lund
Markims kyrka
Markuskyrkan, Stockholm
Marstrands kyrka, Kungälv
Marsvinsholms kyrka
Martebo kyrka
Martin Luther Church (Halmstad)
Masthuggskyrkan, Göteborg
Masugnsby kyrka
Matteus kyrka
Matteus kyrka, Norrköping
Mellan-Grevie kyrka
Mellanhedskapellet, Malmö
Mellby kyrka
Mikaelikyrkan
Mikaelikyrkan, Arvika
Mikaelikyrkan, Skärholmen
Mikaelskyrkan, Göteborg
Mikaelskyrkan, Uppsala
Mikaelskapellet, Stockholm
Minneskyrkan, Frillesås
Missionskyrkan
Missionskyrkan, Alfta
Missionskyrkan, Alvesta
Missionskyrkan, Arboga
Missionskyrkan, Bjursås
Missionskyrkan, Björklinge
Missionskyrkan, Björnlunda
Missionskyrkan, Bollnäs
Missionskyrkan, Edsbyn
Missionskyrkan, Falun
Missionskyrkan, Furulund
Missionskyrkan, Garda
Missionskyrkan, Gävle (Hille)
Missionskyrkan, Götlunda (i Arboga)
Missionskyrkan, Hallstahammar
Missionskyrkan, Harbo
Missionskyrkan, Heby
Missionskyrkan, Hedesunda
Missionskyrkan, Hemse
Missionskyrkan, Hjortsberga
Missionskyrkan, Hudiksvall
Missionskyrkan, Hässleholm
Missionskyrkan, Insjön
Missionskyrkan, Knislinge
Missionskyrkan, Lammhult
Missionskyrkan, Lagan
Missionskyrkan, Leksand
Missionskyrkan, Ljungby
Missionskyrkan, Malmköping
Missionskyrkan, Mockfjärd
Missionskyrkan, Moheda
Missionskyrkan, Möklinta
Missionskyrkan, Mölnbo
Missionskyrkan, Ockelbo
Missionskyrkan, Orsa
Missionskyrkan, Osby
Missionskyrkan, Rättvik
Missionskyrkan, Sala
Missionskyrkan, Slätthög
Missionskyrkan, Stjärnhov
Missionskyrkan, Söderhamn
Missionskyrkan, Södertälje
Missionskyrkan, Tyringe
Missionskyrkan, Tärnsjö
Missionskyrkan, Uppsala
Missionskyrkan, Valbo
Missionskyrkan, Vallby
Missionskyrkan, Vikingstad
Missionskyrkan, Vinslöv
Missionskyrkan, Visby
Missionskyrkan, Växjö
Missionskyrkan, Älmhult
Missionskyrkan, Östervåla
Mo kyrka, Bohuslän
Mogata kyrka
Molla kyrka
Mosjö kyrka
Motala kyrka
Multrå kyrka
Munkegärdekyrkan, Kungälv
Munkhagskyrkan, Mariefred
Munsö kyrka
Muskö kyrka
Månkarbokyrkan, Månkarbo
Mälarhöjdens kyrka, Stockholm
Märsta kyrka
Mölle kapell
Mölleberga kyrka
Mörarps kyrka
Mörbylånga kyrka
Mörkö kyrka

N
Nacka kyrka
Nacksta kyrka
Naverstads kyrka
Nederluleå kyrka = ("Gammelstads kyrka")
Nedre Ulleruds kyrka
Nevishögs kyrka
Nianfors kyrka
Nikkaluokta kapell
Njurunda kyrka, Njurunda
Njutångers kyrka
Nols kyrka
Nordingrå kyrka
Nordmalings kyrka
Norra Björke kyrka
Norra Mellby kyrka
Norra Nöbbelövs kyrka
Norra Skrävlinge kyrka
Norra Vrams kyrka
Norra Åkarps kyrka
Norrby Church
Norrmalmskyrkan, Stockholm
Nornäs kapell
Norrfors kyrka
Norrstrandskyrkan, Karlstad
Norrsunda kyrka
Norrtälje kyrka
Norrvidinge kyrka
Norums kyrka
Nosaby Church
Nossebro kyrka
Nybro kyrka
Nylöse kyrka, Göteborg
Nysunds kyrka, Åtorp
Näsby kyrka
Kalix
Kristianstad
Lindesberg
Vetlanda
Näsbyparks kyrka
Näsets kyrka, Göteborg
Näshults kyrka
Näsums kyrka
Nättraby kyrka

O
Obbola kyrka
Odalkyrkan, Kristianstad
Odarslövs kyrka
Odensala kyrka
Odenslundskyrkan, Östersund
Olaus Petri kyrka, Stockholm
Olivehällkyrkan, Strängnäs
Onsala kyrka
Onslunda kyrka
Orkesta kyrka
Orsa Church
Osby kyrka
Oscarskyrkan, Stockholm
Oscar Fredriks kyrka, Göteborg
Ovansjö kyrka
Ovanåkers kyrka
Oxie kyrka, Malmö

P
Pajala kyrka
Pater Nosterkyrkan, Göteborg
Pauluskapellet, Uppsala
Pelarne kyrka
Persnäs kyrka
Petersgårdens kyrka
Pilgrimskyrkan, Sveg
Pentecost Church
Pentecost Church, Jönköping
Pentecost Church, Kalmar
Pentecost Church, Märsta

R
Ramdala Church
Ramkvilla Church
Ramsberg Church
Ramsåsa Church
Ramundeboda Church, Laxå
Rannebergen Church, Gothenburg
Ransberg Church, Tibro
Ransäter Church
Rasbo Church
Rasbokil Church
Ravlunda Church
Rebbelberga Church
Rejmyre Church
Resarö kapell
Resmo Church
Resö kapell
Revinge Church
Riddarholmen Church, Stockholm
Risbro Church, Fagersta
Rissne Church
Riseberga Church
Risekatslösa Church
Risinge Old Church
Risinge New Church
Roden Church, Norrtälje
Romfartuna Church
Rommele Church
Rosengård Church, Malmö
Rosengård Church, Helsingborg
Roslags-Kulla Church
Royal Chapel, Stockholm
Rudboda Church
Runsten Church
Rystad Church
Rya Church, Frillesås
Rya Church, Örkelljunga
Rytterne Church
Råda Church, Mölnlycke
Rådmansö Church
Råssnäs Church
Råsunda Church
Räng Church
Räpplinge Church
Rättvik Church
Rödbo Church, Gothenburg
Röddinge Church
Rödeby Church
Röke Church
Rök Church
Rönne Church, Ängelholm
Rörum Church
Rösereds kapell, Góthenburg

S
Sabbatsbergs kyrka, Stockholm
Saint Andrew's Church, Göteborg (Engelska kyrkan)
Salabackekyrkan
Sals kyrka
Salemkyrkan/Södermalms Baptistförsamling, Stockholm
Salems kyrka
Samariterhemmets kyrka, Uppsala
Sandby
Sandvikens kyrka
Sankt Andreas kyrka, Malmö
Sankt Ansgars kyrka, Uppsala
Sankt Botvids kyrka
Sankt Clemens kapell, Simrishamn
Sankt Clemens kyrka, Laholm
S:t Clemens kyrkoruin, Visby
Sankt Eriks kapell, Stockholm
S:t Eriks kyrka, Stockholm
S:t Eskils kyrka, Stockholm
Sankt Eskilskyrkan, Eskilstuna
S:ta Gertruds kyrkoruin, Visby
 S:ta Gertruds Kyrka, Kungsbacka
Sankt Görans kyrka, Stockholm
S:t Görans kyrkoruin, Visby
Sankt Hans kyrka, Linköping
Sankt Hans kyrka, Lund
S:t Hans och S:t Pers kyrkoruiner, Visby
Sankt Ibbs kyrka Ven (ö)
Sankt Jakobs kapell, Malmö
Sankt Johannes kyrka
Järrestad
Göteborg
Kalmar
Landskrona
Malmö
Norrköping
Stockholm
Skövde
Värnamo
Sankta Katarina kyrkoruin, Visby
Sankt Knuts kyrka
Lund
Sankt Lars kyrka
Sankt Lars kyrka, Åsa, Halland
Sankt Lars kyrka, Linköping, Östergötland
Sankt Laurentii kyrka, Falkenberg
Sankt Laurentii kyrka, Lund
S:t Laurentii kyrka, Söderköping
S:t Lars kyrkoruin, Visby
Sankt Matteus gravkapell, Göteborg
Sankt Matteus kyrka
Sankt Matteus kyrka, Malmö
Sankt Matteus kyrka, Skövde
Sankt Matteus kyrka, Stockholm
Sankt Mikaels kyrka
Sankt Mikaels kyrka, Kulladal (Malmö)
Sankt Mikaels kyrka, Malmö
Sankt Mikaels kyrka, Södertälje
S:t Mikaels kyrka, Visby
Sankt Nicolai kyrka
Arboga
Halmstad
Lidköping
Nyköping
Simrishamn
Sölvesborg
Trelleborg
Sankt Nicolaus kyrkoruin, Visby
S:t Olai kyrka, Norrköping
Sankt Olofs kyrka
Sankt Olofs kyrka, Falköping
Sankt Olofs kyrka, Helsingborg
Sankt Olofs domkyrka i Sigtuna
Sankt Olofs kyrka, Täby
Sankt Olofs kyrka, Uppsala
Sankt Olofs kyrka, Österlen
S:t Olofs kyrkoruin, Visby
Sankt Pauli kyrka
Göteborg
Malmö
Sankt Peders kyrka
Sankt Pers kyrka
Sankt Pers kyrkoruin, Sigtuna.
Sankt Pers kyrka, Uppsala.
Sankt Pers kyrka, Vadstena.
Sankt Peters Klosters kyrka, Lund
Sankt Peterskyrkan, Stockholm
Sankt Petri kyrka
Klippan
Malmö
Ystad
Sankt Sigfrids kyrka
Nybro kommun
Stockholm
Sankt Staffans kyrka
Sankt Thomas kapell, Malmö
Sankt Tomas kyrka, Stockholm
S:t Trinitatis kyrkoruin, Visby
Sankta Anna kyrka, Ramsberg
Sankta Birgittas kapell, Göteborg
Sankta Birgitta kyrka, Kalmar
S:ta Birgitta kyrka, Stockholm
Sankta Clara kyrka, Stockholm
Sankta Helena kyrka, Skövde
Sankta Katarina kyrka, Malmö
Sankta Maria kyrka
Borrby
Helsingborg
Lidköping
Malmö
Risinge
Uppsala
Ystad
Åhus
Sankta Ragnhilds kyrka, Södertälje
Saxdalens kapell
Saxnäs kyrka
Segeltorps kyrka
Segerstads kyrka
Seglora kyrka
Seljansborgs kyrka
Sidensjö kyrka
Silbodals kyrka
Silverdalskapellet
Silvåkra kyrka
Simris kyrka
Sireköpinge kyrka
Sjougdnäs kapell
Själevads kyrka
Sjömanskyrkan, Göteborg
Sjöstadskapellet, Stockholm
Skabersjö kyrka
Skaga stavkyrka
Skallsjö kyrka
Skanörs kyrka
Skara domkyrka, Skara
Skederids kyrka
Skedevi kyrka
Skee kyrka
Skegrie kyrka
Skellefteå landsförsamlings kyrka
Skepparslövs kyrka
Skepplanda kyrka
Skeppsholmskyrkan
Skillinge kapell
Skivarps kyrka
Skogs kyrka
Skogshöjdens kyrka
Skogsängskyrkan, Rönninge
Skoklosters kyrka
Skredsviks kyrka
Skultuna kyrka
Skurups kyrka
Skuttunge kyrka
Skålleruds kyrka
Skårs kyrka, Göteborg
Skälbykyrkan, Runtuna
Skällviks kyrka
Skälvums kyrka
Skärhamns kyrka
Skärholmens kyrka, Stockholm
Skönberga kyrka
Sköns kyrka
Skönsmons kyrka, Sundsvall
Skörstorps kyrka
Smedby kyrka
Smedstorps kyrka
Snavlunda kyrka
Snårestads kyrka
Snöstorps kyrka
Sofia Albertina Church, Landskrona
Sofia Church, Jönköping
Sofia Church, Stockholm
Solberga kyrka
Solberga kyrka, Bohuslän
Solberga kyrka, Skåne
Solberga kyrka, Västergötland
Sollentuna kyrka
Solna kyrka
Sorbykyrkan, Köping
Sorunda kyrka
Sparlösa kyrka
Spekeröds kyrka
Spikarö kapell
Spjutstorps kyrka
Spånga kyrka, Stockholm
Stadionkyrkan, Malmö
Stadsökyrkan, Luleå
Staffans kyrka, Gävle
Stala kyrka
Stampens gravkapell, Göteborg
Starrkärrs kyrka
Stavby kyrka
Stefanskyrkan, Stockholm
Stehags kyrka
Stenkumla kyrka
Stenkvista kyrka
Stenkyrka kyrka
Gotland
Bohuslän
Stensele kyrka
Stensjökyrkan
Stenungsunds kapell
Stenåsa kyrka
Stiby kyrka
Stjärnsunds kyrka
Stockaryds kyrka
Stockslyckekyrkan
Stora Hammars gamla kyrka
Stora Hammars kyrka
Stora Harrie kyrka
Stora Herrestads kyrka
Stora Kopparbergs kyrka
Stora Köpinge kyrka
Stora Mellby kyrka
Stora Råby kyrka
Stora Skedvi kyrka
Stora Tuna kyrka
Storkyrkan, Stockholm
Storkällans kapell
Storsäterns kapell
Strandkyrkan
Strandkyrkan, Burgsvik
Strandkyrkan, Lomma
Strängnäs domkyrka
Ströms kyrka
Strömstads kyrka
Stuguns gamla kyrka
Stuguns nya kyrka
Sturkö kyrka
Stuvstakyrkan, Huddinge
Styrsö kyrka, Göteborg
Stångby kyrka
Stävie kyrka
Stångby kyrka
Stöde kyrka
Sundborns kyrka
Sundbybergs kyrka, Sundbyberg
Sundre kyrka
Sunne kyrka, Härnösands stift
Sunnersta kyrka
Suntaks gamla kyrka
Svalövs kyrka
Svarteborgs kyrka
Svedvi kyrka
Svegs kyrka
Svenneby kyrka
Svenneby gamla kyrka
Svensköps kyrka
Svenstakyrkan, Svenstavik
Svenstorps kyrka
Svärdsjö kyrka
Sånga kyrka, Härnösands stift
Sånga kyrka, Stockholms stift
Säby kyrka
Säbykyrkan, Salem
Säbykyrkan, Åkersberga
Säfsnäs kyrka
Sälens fjällkyrka
Särna Gammelkyrka
Särna Kyrka
Särslövs kyrka
Säters kyrka, Västerås stift
Sätila kyrka
Sätra kyrka, Stockholm
Sätunakyrkan, Märsta
Säve kyrka, Göteborg
Sävja kyrka
Söderala kyrka
Söderbykarls kyrka
Söderbärke kyrka
Söderhöjdskyrkan, Stockholm
Söderledskyrkan, Stockholm
Södermalms Baptistförsamling/Salemkykan, Stockholm
Södertälje sjukhuskyrka
Södervidinge kyrka
Södra Biskopsgårdens kyrka
Södra Kedums kyrka
Södra Mellby kyrka
Södra Möckleby kyrka
Södra Råda gamla kyrka
Södra Sallerups kyrka, Malmö
Södra Sandby kyrka
Södra Vi kyrka
Södra Åkarps kyrka
Södra Åsums gamla kyrka
Södra Åsums kyrka
Söne kyrka
Sövde kyrka
Sövestads kyrka, Ystad

T
Tabernaklet, Göteborg
Tacksägelsekyrkan, Trångsund
Tanums kyrka
Taxinge kyrka
Tegneby kyrka
Tegs kyrka
Tensta kyrka, Vattholma
Tenstakyrkan, Tensta
Tibble kyrka
Tierps kyrka
Timrå kyrka
Tingstads kyrka
Tingstäde kyrka
Tingsås kyrka
Tirups kyrka
Tjolöholms kyrka, Kungsbacka
Tofta kyrka, Gotland
Tomelilla kyrka
 Torestorps kyrka, Mark
Toresunds kyrka
Tornehamns kapell
Torrlösa kyrka
Torshälla kyrka
Torskinge kyrka
Torslunda
Torsångs kyrka
Tosterups kyrka
Tottarps kyrka
Toleredskyrkan, Göteborg
Torslanda kyrka, Göteborg
Transtrands kyrka
Tranås kyrka
Trefaldighetskyrkan
Trefaldighetskyrkan, Arvika
Trefaldighetskyrkan (Karlskrona)
Triangle Church, Enskede
Karlskrona
Trollbäckens kyrka
Trollhättans kyrka
Tryde kyrka
Träne kyrka
Trökörna kyrka
Tumbo kyrka
Tun kyrka
Tuna kyrka
Tunabergskyrkan
Tunadalskyrkan, Köping
Tunge kyrka
Tuolluvaara kyrka
Tureholmskyrkan, Sösdala
Turinge kyrka
Tuve kyrka, Göteborg
Tveta kyrka, Södertälje kommun
Tveta kyrka, Hultsfreds kommun
Tveta kyrka, Säffle kommun
Två systrars kapell, Kalmar
Tynnereds kyrka, Göteborg
Tyngsjö kyrka
Tygelsjö kyrka, Malmö
Tyresö kyrka
Tåby kyrka
Täby kyrka
Tämta kyrka
Tångeråsa kyrka

U
Ubbhults kapell
Ullstorps kyrka
Ulrika-Eleonora kyrka, Ludvika
Undenäs kyrka
Umeå stads kyrka, Umeå
Undersviks kyrka
Uppåkra kyrka
Uppenbarelsekyrkan, Hägersten
Uppenbarelsekyrkan, Saltsjöbaden
Upphärads kyrka
Uppsala domkyrka
Utby kyrka, Göteborg

V
Vada Church
Vaksala Church, Uppsala
Valbo Church
Vallakyrkan, Handen
Vallby Church, Eskilstuna
Vallby Church, Skåne
Vallda Church
Valleberga Church
Vallentuna Church
Vallersvikskyrkan, Frillesås
Vallkärra Church
Valsätrakyrkan, Uppsala
Vantörs kyrka, Stockholm
Varnhems kyrka
Vasakyrkan
Vasakyrkan, Gothenburg
Vasakyrkan, Hedemora
Vasakyrkan, Kalmar
Vasakyrkan, Umeå
Vaxholm Church
Veberöds kyrka
Vedevågs kyrka
Vellinge Church
Vena Church
Vendels kyrka
Vendelsö Church
Ventlinge Church
Verums kyrka
Vesene Church
Vickleby Church
Vika Church
Vikingstads kyrka
Vikmanshyttans kyrka
Vilunda Church
Vimmerby Church
Vindelns kyrka
Vindhemskyrkan S:ta Birgitta
Vinnerstads kyrka
Virestads kyrka
Virke Church
Virserums kyrka
Visnums kyrka
Visnums-Kils kyrka
Visseltofta Church
Vitaby Church
Vittangi Church
Vittskövle Church
Vombs kyrka
Voxna Church
Vreta klosterkyrka
Vännäs Church
Vilhelmina Church
Visby domkyrka
Vrångö Church, Göteborg
Vånga Church, Skåne
Vånga Church, Östergötland
Vårby gård Church
Vårdkasekyrkan, Järfälla
Vårdsberg Church
Vårfrukyrkan, Gothenburg
Välinge Church
Välluvs kyrka
Väne Åsaka kyrka
Väne Ryrs kyrka
Västanfors Church
Västerkyrkan, Lund
Västerledskyrkan, Enköping
Västerledskyrkan, Stockholm
Västerortskyrkan, Vällingby
Västerportkyrkan, Kalmar
Västerslättskyrkan, Umeå
Västerstrandskyrkan, Karlstad
Västerås domkyrka
Västra Broby Church
Västra Frölunda Church, Gothenburg
Västra Gerum Church
Västra Hoby Church
Västra Husby Church
Västra Ingelstad Church
Västra Karaby Church
Västra Klagstorp Church, Malmö
Västra Nöbbelöv Church
Västra Sallerup Church
Västra Skrävlinge Church, Malmö
Västra Strö Church
Västra Tommarp Church
Västra Tunhem Church
Västra Vemmenhög Church
Västra Vemmerlöv Church
Västra Vram Church
Vätö Church
Växjö Cathedral

Y
Ysane kyrka
Ytterby kyrka
Ytterby gamla kyrka
Ytterenhörna kyrka
Yttergrans kyrka
Ytterlännäs gamla kyrka
Ytterselö kyrka

Å
Å kyrka
Åbybergskyrkan, Vallentuna
Åbylundskyrkan
Ådalskyrkan
Ådalskyrkan, Gnesta
Ådalskyrkan, Kramfors
Åkerby kyrka
Åkersberga kyrka
Ålands kyrka
Ålems kyrka
Ålidhemskyrkan
Åmsele Kyrka
Åmåls kyrka
Åre Old Church
Ås kyrka
Åsele kyrka
Åsenhöga kyrka
Åsljunga kyrka

Ä
Älvdalens kyrka, Älvdalen
Älvsborgs fästningskyrka, Göteborg
Älvsborgs kyrka, Göteborg
Älvsjökyrkan, Älvsjö
Älvängens kyrka
Ängby kyrka, Stockholm
Ängelholms kyrka
Ängskyrkan
Ärentuna kyrka
Äsphults kyrka
Äspinge kyrka
Ättetorpskyrkan

Ö
Öckerö gamla kyrka
Öckerö nya kyrka
Ödenäs kyrka
Ödeshögs kyrka
Ödsmåls kyrka
Öhrs kyrka
Öja kyrka, Ystad
Öja kyrka, Gotland
Öja kyrka, Småland
Öja kyrka, Södermanland
Öjaby kyrka
Ökna kyrka
Ölme kyrka
 Ölmevalla kyrka, Åsa, Halland
Önnarps kyrka
Önnestads kyrka
Örgryte gamla kyrka, Göteborg
Örgryte nya kyrka, Göteborg
Örja kyrka
Örkelljunga kyrka
Örkeneds kyrka
Örnsköldsviks kyrka
Örnäsets kyrka
Örserums kyrka
Örsjö kyrka, Skåne
Örsjö kyrka, Småland
Örtomta kyrka
Ösmo kyrka
Össeby-Garns kyrka
Össjö kyrka
Östads kyrka
Österhaninge kyrka
Österledskyrkan, Uppsala
Österkyrkan, Eslöv
Österviks kapell
Östervåla kyrka
Österåkers kyrka
Östra Fågelviks kyrka
Östra Grevie kyrka
Östra Herrestads kyrka
Östra Hoby kyrka
Östra Husby kyrka
Östra Ingelstads kyrka
Östra Karaby kyrka
Östra Karups kyrka
Östra Klagstorps kyrka
Östra Kärrstorps kyrka
Östra Ny kyrka
Östra Nöbbelövs kyrka
Östra Ryds kyrka, Uppland
Östra Ryds kyrka, Östergötland
Östra Strö kyrka
Östra Sönnarslövs kyrka
Östra Tommarps kyrka
Östra Torps kyrka
Östra Vemmenhögs kyrka
Östra Vemmerlövs kyrka
Östra Vrams kyrka
Östra kyrkogården, Malmö
Östra kyrkogårdskapellet, Göteborg
Östuna kyrka
Öveds kyrka
Överenhörna kyrka
Övergrans kyrka
Överjärna kyrka
Överklintens kyrka
Överluleå kyrka
Överselö kyrka
Övertorneå kyrka
Övre Ulleruds kyrka
Övraby kyrka

External links
Riksantikvarieämbetets bebyggelseregister
Svenska kyrkan
Svenska kyrkor på Google maps

Churches in Sweden
Religious buildings and structures in Sweden
Sweden
Churches